Moste may refer to a number of settlements in Slovenia: 

Moste, Ljubljana, a neighborhood of Ljubljana
Moste, Žirovnica, a village in the Municipality of Žirovnica 
Moste, Komenda, a settlement in the Municipality of Komenda